This is a list of the public holidays of the Malaysian state of Sabah and Sarawak. Dates given are those on which the holidays were celebrated in 2006. Some are Malaysian national holidays, while others are celebrated only in Sabah and Sarawak.

List of Holidays
 New Year's Day, January 1
 Chinese New Year, January - February
 Maal Hijrah (Awal Muharram, or Muslim New Year), 1 Muḥarram
 Maulidur Rasul (Birthday of the Prophet Muhammad), 12 Rabī‘ al-Awwal
 Good Friday, Friday in March or April
 Labour Day, May 1
 Wesak Day, May 
 Harvest Festival, May 30–31 (Sabah and Labuan only)
 Birthday Celebration of SPB Yang di-Pertuan Agong (King's Birthday), Saturday in June
 Hari Merdeka (National Day), August 31
 Malaysia Day September 16 
 Birthday of Yang di-Pertua Negeri (State governor, Sabah only), Saturday in October
 Deepavali, October - November
 Eid Al-Fitr (Hari Raya Puasa), 1 Shawwal
Christmas Eve , December 24
 Christmas Day, December 25
 Eid Al-Adha (Hari Raya Qurban), 10 Dhū al-Ḥijjah

See also
Public holidays in Malaysia

Sabah
Sabah and Sarawak